The 2015–16 SC Bastia season is the 50th consecutive season of the club in the French professional leagues. The club competes in Ligue 1, the Coupe de la Ligue and the Coupe de France.

Players

French teams are limited to four players without EU citizenship. Hence, the squad list includes only the principal nationality of each player; several non-European players on the squad have dual citizenship with an EU country. Also, players from the ACP countries—countries in Africa, the Caribbean, and the Pacific that are signatories to the Cotonou Agreement—are not counted against non-EU quotas due to the Kolpak ruling.

Current squad

As of 27 January 2016.

Out on loan

Transfers

In

Loans in

Out

Loans out

Competitions

Ligue 1

League table

Results summary

Results by round

Matches

Coupe de France

Coupe de la Ligue

References

SC Bastia seasons
Bastia